The 1989 American South Conference men's basketball tournament was held March 4–6 at the Cajundome at University of Southwestern Louisiana in Lafayette, Louisiana.

Louisiana Tech defeated  in the championship game, 84–62, to take home their second American South men's basketball tournament title.

The Bulldogs received an automatic invitation to the 1989 NCAA Tournament as the #9 seed in the Southeast region. They defeated La Salle 83–74 before losing to #1 seed Oklahoma 124–81.

Format
All six of the conference's founding members participated in the tournament field. They were seeded based on regular season conference records. The top two teams were given byes into the semifinals while the bottom four teams were placed and paired into the initial quarterfinal round.

All games were played at the Cajundome in Lafayette, Louisiana.

Bracket

References

American South Conference men's basketball tournament
1988–89 American South Conference men's basketball season
1989 in sports in Louisiana